Forestburg High School or Forestburg School is a public high school located in unincorporated Forestburg, Texas (USA) and classified as a 1A school by the UIL.  It is part of the Forestburg Independent School District located in southeastern Montague County.   In 2015, the school was rated "Met Standard" by the Texas Education Agency.

Athletics
The Forestburg Longhorns compete in these sports - 

Basketball
Cross Country
6-Man Football
Golf
Tennis
Track and Field
Volleyball

Forestburg ISD fielded their first football team in 2007. The Longhorns made the six man playoffs following a 7-3 regular season in 2012, which included a 38–16 victory over rival St. Jo. The Horns have compiled a 28–43 record since restarting the program.

See also 

 List of high schools in Texas
 List of Six-man football stadiums in Texas

References

External links 
 

Schools in Montague County, Texas
Public high schools in Texas
Public middle schools in Texas
Public elementary schools in Texas